Fort Dupont Park is a  wooded park under the management of the National Park Service located in Washington, DC. The name of the park comes from the old Civil War earthwork fort that lies within the park. 
The fort was one of several designed to defend Washington from a Confederate attack during the Civil War. There are few remains of the actual fortifications.

It is one of Washington's largest parks and protects an important sub-watershed of the Anacostia River. The park is a popular place for picnics, nature walks, indoor ice skating, mountain bike riding, gardening, environmental education, music, skating, sports, and ranger-led Civil War programs.

Adjacent parks
Fort Dupont Park is adjacent to a series of other national and DC parks. Commonly people refer to all of them together as Fort Dupont. These are the adjacent parks:
 US government:
 Fort Chaplin Park
 Fort Davis Park
 Fort Stanton Park
 Smithsonian Anacostia Community Museum
 DC government:
 Benning Stoddert Recreation Center
 Alger Park
 Fort Battery Ricketts
 Avalon Playground

Facilities

Concert venue
Fort Dupont has a 40-year history of offering a summer concert series. Many famous musicians and bands in the Washington, D.C., area have played this venue.

Hiker-biker trail
The unpaved Hiker-Biker Trail is the primary trail in the park, but there are various side spur trails throughout the parks. While most call the entire park Fort Dupont Park, it is actually four adjacent parks, Fort Chaplin, Fort Dupont, Fort Davis and Fort Stanton, and the trails run through them all from Grant Street SE (north of Benning) south to Erie Street SE near the Avalon Playground.

The first  of trail, from Pennsylvania Ave to Ridge Road, was opened on November 10, 1968.

History
Fort Dupont was an earthwork fort built in 1861 as part of the Civil War Defenses of Washington, completed in spring 1862, and in use till 1865 when it was abandoned. The land was owned by Micheal Canton prior to the war and returned to him afterward. The fort was a hexagon with  sides; inside was a flag pole, deep well, officer quarters, and barracks, while outside was a guard house. The fort was an artillery installation defending the eastern approaches of Washington.

During the war the following pieces were at the fort:
 3 - 8 inch howitzers (en embrasure)
 3 - 24 pounder seacoast guns (en barbette)
 2 - 6 pounder field guns
 1 - 24 pounder Coehorn mortar.

Fort Dupont never fired guns in hostile action; however, after the surrender of Confederate forces at Appomattox Court House on April 9, 1865, according to John Longyear, "the Chain of forts around the city and the batteries of field artillery between, made a ring of cannons around the city which were fired for several hours. The line of cannon salutes running round and round the other always proceeding in the same direction, so that it went round and round the circuit 20 to 30 miles".

References

External links
 Fort Dupont Park official website

Civil War defenses of Washington, D.C.
Forts in the District of Columbia
American Civil War forts
Fort Dupont Park
Fort Dupont Park
Fort Dupont Park
Forts on the National Register of Historic Places in Washington, D.C.
Fort Dupont Park
Southeast (Washington, D.C.)